Pumpkin pie is a dessert pie with a spiced, pumpkin-based custard filling. The pumpkin and pumpkin pie are both a symbol of harvest time, and pumpkin pie is generally eaten during the fall and early winter. In the United States and Canada it is usually prepared for Thanksgiving, Christmas, and other occasions when pumpkin is in season.

The pie's filling ranges in color from orange to brown and is baked in a single pie shell, usually without a top crust. The pie is generally flavored with a spice mixture known as pumpkin pie spice, which is made using spices such as ginger, nutmeg, cinnamon, and allspice. The pie is usually prepared with canned pumpkin, but fresh-cooked pumpkin can be used.

Overview

They are considerably smaller than the typically larger varieties used to carve jack o'lanterns, contain significantly less pulp, and have a less stringy texture. The flesh is cooked until soft and puréed before being blended with the other ingredients.

The pulp is mixed with eggs, evaporated or sweetened condensed milk, sugar, and a spice mixture called pumpkin pie spice. This typically includes cinnamon, powdered ginger, nutmeg, and cloves. Allspice is also commonly used and can replace the clove and nutmeg, as its flavor is similar to both combined. Cardamom and vanilla are also sometimes used as batter spices. The pie is then baked in a pie shell and sometimes topped with whipped cream. Similar pies are made with butternut squash or sweet potato fillings.

The pie is often made from canned pumpkin, which is prepared mainly from varieties of Cucurbita pepo and Cucurbita maxima. Packaged pumpkin pie filling with spices included is also used. A December 1988 report by the U.S. Food and Drug Administration found that canned pumpkin products sometimes have sweet squash mixed in with the pumpkin "to obtain the same texture that is well-liked by consumers."

Many modern companies produce seasonal pumpkin-pie-flavored products such as candy, cheesecake, coffee, ice cream, french toast, waffles and pancakes, and many breweries produce a seasonal pumpkin ale or beer; these are generally not flavored with pumpkins, but rather pumpkin pie spices. Commercially made pumpkin pie mix is made from Cucurbita pepo, Cucurbita maxima and Cucurbita moschata. (Libby's pumpkin pie mix uses the Select Dickinson Pumpkin variety of C. moschata for its canned pumpkins.)

History 

The pumpkin is native to North America. The pumpkin was an early export to France; from there it was introduced to Tudor England, and the flesh of the "pompion" was quickly accepted as pie filling. During the seventeenth century, pumpkin pie recipes could be found in English cookbooks, such as Hannah Woolley's The Gentlewoman's Companion (1675). Pumpkin "pies" made by early American colonists were more likely to be a savory soup made and served in a pumpkin than a sweet custard in a crust. Pumpkins were also stewed and made into ale by colonists. An early appearance of a more modern, custard-like pumpkin pie was in American Cookery, a cookbook published in 1796. It used a sweet custard filling in a pie crust, with spices similar to the ones used today.

It was not until the early nineteenth century that the recipes appeared in Canadian and American cookbooks or that pumpkin pie became a common addition to the Thanksgiving dinner. The Pilgrims brought the pumpkin pie back to New England, while the English method of cooking the pumpkin took a different course. In the 19th century, the English pumpkin pie was prepared by stuffing the pumpkin with apples, spices, and sugar and then baking it whole. In the United States after the Civil War, the pumpkin pie was resisted in Southern states as a symbol of Yankee culture imposed on the South, where there was no tradition of eating pumpkin pie. Many Southern cooks instead made sweet potato pie, or added bourbon and pecans to give the pumpkin pie a Southern touch.

Today, throughout much of Canada and the United States, it is traditional to serve pumpkin pie after Thanksgiving dinner.

Pumpkin pies were discouraged from Thanksgiving dinners in the United States in 1947 as part of a voluntary egg rationing campaign promoted by the Truman Administration, mainly because of the eggs used in the recipe. This was a part of President Truman's Citizen's Food Committee task force, designed to ration food consumption in the United States in hopes to provide more foreign food assistance to Europe post World War II. Part of the campaign included an "Egg-less & Poultry-less Thursday", which began in October 1947, and with Thanksgiving Day always occurring on a Thursday, there was a considerable backlash among American consumers against this. Truman was true to his word, and no pumpkin pie was served at the White House for Thanksgiving in 1947.

In popular culture

Poetry
Lydia Maria Child's Thanksgiving poem "Over the River and Through the Wood" (1844) references pumpkin pie in one of its verses: "Hurrah for the fun! Is the pudding done? / Hurrah for the pumpkin pie!" 
Mathew Franklin Whittier, signing as "A Yankee," wrote in his poem "Song of the Pumpkin" (1846):

Songs
Oscar Ferdinand Telgmann and George Frederick Cameron wrote the song "Farewell O Fragrant Pumpkin Pie" in the opera Leo, the Royal Cadet (1889):

The Christmas-themed song "There's No Place Like Home for the Holidays" makes a reference to homemade pumpkin pie being looked forward to by a man returning to his family's home in Pennsylvania. 
 The popular Christmas song "Rockin' Around the Christmas Tree" contains the lyric, "Later we'll have some pumpkin pie/And we'll do some caroling".
"Sleigh Ride", another popular Christmas song, also mentions sitting around a fire after being out in the snow and eating pumpkin pie.

Records
The world's largest pumpkin pie was made in New Bremen, Ohio, at the New Bremen Pumpkinfest on September 25, 2010.

Image gallery

See also

 Bundevara
 Custard tart
 Key lime pie
 List of pies
 List of squash and pumpkin dishes
 Pastel de nata
 Sweet potato pie

Notes

References

External links

American pies
Custard desserts
Halloween food
Squash and pumpkin dishes
Sweet pies
Thanksgiving food
Christmas food
Symbols of Illinois
Canadian desserts
New England cuisine
Cuisine of the Midwestern United States